This is a list of Turkish television related events from 2003.

Events
24 May - Turkey wins the 48th Eurovision Song Contest in Riga, Latvia. The winning song is "Everyway That I Can", performed by Sertab Erener.

Debuts

Television shows

Ending this year

Births

Deaths

See also
2003 in Turkey